Roger Anthony Scantlebury (born August 1936) is a British computer scientist who worked at the National Physical Laboratory (NPL) and later at Logica.

Scantlebury participated in pioneering work to develop packet switching and associated communication protocols at the NPL in the late 1960s. He proposed the use of the technology in the ARPANET, the forerunner of the Internet, at the inaugural Symposium on Operating Systems Principles in 1967. During the 1970s, he was an active member of international working groups that developed concepts for the interconnection of computer networks.

Early life
Roger Scantlebury was born in Ealing in 1936.

Career

National Physical Laboratory
Scantlebury worked at the National Physical Laboratory in south-west London, in collaboration with the National Research Development Corporation (NRDC). His early work was on the Automatic Computing Engine and English Electric DEUCE computers.

Following this he worked with Donald Davies on his pioneering packet switching concepts. Scantlebury is one of the first people to describe the term protocol in a data-communications context in an April 1967 memorandum entitled "A Protocol for Use in the NPL Data Communications Network" written with Keith Bartlett. In October 1967, he attended the Symposium on Operating Systems Principles in the United States, where he gave an exposition of packet-switching, developed at NPL. Also attending the conference was Larry Roberts, from the ARPA; this was the first time that Larry Roberts had heard of packet switching. Scantlebury persuaded Roberts and other American engineers to incorporate the concept into the design for the ARPANET.

Subsequently he worked on development of the NPL Data Communications Network. He was seconded to the Post Office Telecommunications in 1969, participating in a data communications study and supervising four data communications-related research contracts. This research team developed the alternating bit protocol (ABP).

Along with Donald Davies and Derek Barber he participated in the International Networking Working Group (INWG) from 1972, initially chaired by Vint Cerf. He was acknowledged by Bob Kahn and Vint Cerf in their seminal 1974 paper on internetworking, "A Protocol for Packet Network Intercommunication", and he co-authored the standard agreed by the INWG in 1975, "Proposal for an international end to end protocol".

Later, as head of the data networks group within the Computer Science Division, he was responsible for the UK technical contribution to the European Informatics Network, a datagram network linking CERN, the French research centre INRIA and the UK’s National Physical Laboratory.

Logica
He joined Logica in 1977 in their Communications Division, where he worked on the CCITT (ITU-T) X.25 protocol and with the formation of the Euronet, a virtual circuit network using X.25. He moved to the Finance Division in 1981.

Personal life
He married Christine Appleby in 1958 in Middlesex; they had two sons in 1961 and 1966, and a daughter in 1963. He lives in Esher.

Scantlebury was influential in persuading NPL to sponsor a gallery about "Technology of the Internet" at The National Museum of Computing, which opened in 2009.

Publications

See also
History of the Internet
Internet in the United Kingdom § History
List of Internet pioneers
Protocol Wars

References

External links
Internet Dreamers BBC interview with Vint Cerf, Bob Taylor, Larry Roberts and Roger Scantlebury, 2000
Celebrating 40 years of the net BBC News article quoting Roger Scantlebury, 2009
'Packet switching' system's first computer network BBC News interview with Roger Scantlebury, 2010
Alan Turing and the Ace computer,  BBC News series on British computer pioneers, 2010
The Story of Packet Switching,  Interview with Roger Scantlebury, Peter Wilkinson, Keith Bartlett, and Brian Aldous, 2011
Protocol Wars, Interview with Roger Scantlebury for the Computer History Museum, 2011
Internet pioneers airbrushed from history, Letter to the Guardian, 2013
The birth of the Internet in the UK, Google video featuring Vint Cerf, Roger Scantlebury, Peter Kirstein, Peter Wilkinson, 2013
The Joy of Data BBC Four program featuring an interview with Roger Scantlebury, 2016
How we nearly invented the internet in the UK Letter to the New Scientist, 2020
Fifty Years of the Internet Technology Event featuring Roger Scantlebury at The National Museum of Computing, 2020

1936 births
Living people
British computer scientists
History of computing in the United Kingdom
Internet pioneers
Packets (information technology)
People from Brentford
People from Esher
Scientists of the National Physical Laboratory (United Kingdom)